The Antarctic Sun is an online newspaper with "News about the USAP, the Ice, and the People."  It is funded by the National Science Foundation (contract no. NSFDACS1219442) by its prime civilian contractor, Leidos Antarctic Support Contract.

The online publication has been covering cutting edge science for the National Science Foundation since 1997–1998 austral summer, though it can trace its history back to the 1950s when the U.S. Navy ran logistics for the USAP. From the austral summer of 1997–98 to 2006–07, The Antarctic Sun has been produced at McMurdo Station between the months of October and February. Since October 2007, it has been a year-round news website managed out of the Denver, Colorado area.

The website covers both science and features. The former includes biology, glaciology, geology, astrophysics and oceanography, among others. Features include USAP operations, Antarctic history, and profiles on people. Since 2016, the website has also featured podcasts primarily about operations.

Antarctic Sun journalists
In order of tenure, from most recent:
Lauren Lipuma 
Mike Lucibella
Peter Rejcek 
Steven Profaizer
Steve Martaindale
Emily Stone
Brien Barnett
Kris Kuenning
Melanie Conner
Mark Sabbatini
Kristan Hutchison
Beth Minneci
Jeff Inglis
Josh Landis
Aaron Spitzer
Ginny Figlar
Alexander Colhoun

References

External links
 
 Past Issues archive

Communications in Antarctica
McMurdo Station
United States Antarctic Program
Weekly newspapers
1996 establishments in Antarctica
Newspapers established in 1996
Antarctica newsletters and newspapers